Derek Backman (born January 6, 1966) is a retired U.S. soccer midfielder who played in the USISL.
Backman played for the Arcadia Shepherds in his native South Africa before moving to the United States in 1983 to attend the College of Boca Raton. In 1987, Backman and his teammates won the NAIA national men's soccer championship. Backman was also a two time first team NAIA All American. He graduated in 1989 and was inducted into the school's Athletic Hall of Fame in 2004.
In 1988, Backman signed with the Tampa Bay Rowdies as it prepared to enter the newly established American Soccer League.   He moved to the Fort Lauderdale Strikers for the first part of the 1989 season before returning to the Rowdies for the end of the season.  He then remained a regular with the team until sidelined in 1993 with a stress fracture in his left ankle. In 1990, the Rowdies moved to the American Professional Soccer League and folded at the end of the 1993 season. Backman remained in the Tampa area, coaching youth soccer and working in his family's interior design business.  He also played with the amateur St. Petersburg Kickers. In 1995, Backman gained his U.S. citizenship. That year, he played for the expansion Tampa Bay Cyclones in the USISL. In February 1996, the Tampa Bay Mutiny selected Backman in the 11th round (107th overall) of the 1996 MLS Inaugural Player Draft. He played 25 games with the Mutiny in 1996, but only three in 1997.  He retired in 1998.  He currently plays for the amateur team Kaknballz FC, who won the state title in 2017.

References

External links
Tampa Bay Rowdies Player Profile

1966 births
American Professional Soccer League players
American Soccer League (1988–89) players
American soccer players
Fort Lauderdale Strikers (1988–1994) players
St. Petersburg Kickers players
South African emigrants to the United States
Tampa Bay Cyclones players
Tampa Bay Mutiny players
Tampa Bay Rowdies (1975–1993) players
USISL players
Lynn Fighting Knights men's soccer players
Living people
Major League Soccer players
South African soccer players
South African expatriate soccer players
South African expatriate sportspeople in the United States
Association football midfielders